Al Jami'ul Kabeer or Khutba Periya Palli is a mosque in Kayalpattinam, Tamil Nadu, India. Built in 842 AD by Muhammad Khalji. It has an Islamic heritage of more than 1000 years. It is located in Kayalpattinam, an ancient port town in the South Indian state of Tamil Nadu known for its Islamic culture. It was built in 842 AD and was re-constructed in 1336 by Sultan Sayyid Jamaluddin. The mosque along with the others in the town, is one of the greatest examples how Dravidian architecture influenced on Islamic architecture. This mosque has the special name "Aayirangal Thoon Palli" There is a huge cemetery along with this mosque.

References

External links 
 Aspects_of_Early_Muslim_Settlements_in_Kayalpattinam
Muslim Architecture of South India | Mahrdad Shokoohy
Big Jamiah (Kutba Periya) Masjid | Sufi Manzil
Kutba Periya Palli | India9

Mosques in Tamil Nadu
Mosques in India
Islam in Tamil Nadu